Liolaemus hermannunezi is a species of lizard in the family  Liolaemidae. It is native to Chile and Argentina.

References

hermannunezi
Reptiles described in 2007
Reptiles of Argentina
Reptiles of Chile